Father Schoenig's chocolate (Parantica schoenigi) is a species of nymphalid butterfly, endemic to the Philippines.

References

Sources

Parantica
Lepidoptera of the Philippines
Butterflies described in 1971
Taxonomy articles created by Polbot